The Camionetta Desertica Model 42 (also known as the SPA-Viberti AS.42 or Sahariana) was an Italian reconnaissance car of World War II. The AS.42 (Africa Settentrionale = North Africa) was developed by SPA-Viberti using the same chassis as the AB 41 armoured car, including its four-wheel steering, but with a 2x4 transmission specifically for desert operations, primarily in a reconnaissance role. Its origins trace back to requests stemming from units operating on the North African front for a long range, highly maneuverable vehicle, similar to those widely used by the highly successful British reconnaissance and raiding force, the Long Range Desert Group (LRDG).

Design
The AS.42 was a 4x2 unarmored vehicle with a boat hull based on the chassis of the AB 41 armored car, but with a 2x4 transmission. The  SPA ABM 3 6 cylinder petrol engine  was located in the rear which gave enough space in the middle of the hull to accommodate up to five fully equipped men and weapons, though the mission crew seldom exceeded three or four. The open compartment's only overhead protection was a waterproof canvas sheet. Besides the driver’s seat, the crew that served the on board weapons were seated on four folding seats on the sides. The AS 42 had internal fuel tanks of 145 liters with an additional 20 jerrycans externally mounted on both sides between the wheels plus 4 on the front fenders, holding a total of 80 liters of water and 400 liters of fuel.

A second model, called Camionetta II or Metropolitana, entered service in Italy in 1943. It differed from the first model by the absence of the two upper side rows of petrol jerrycans, replaced by two large caissons for ammunition, and the presence of a canvas top. In addition, this version was fitted with new Pirelli Artiglio, Sigillo Verde or Raiflex  tires adapted to mud and snow of the mainland, unlike the previous Pirelli Tipo Libia or Superflex sand tires.

Armament
The vehicles were fitted with a main weapon that was a  Breda Model 35 autocannon or a 20 mm Solothurn S-18/1000 anti-tank rifle or, for heavier firepower, a  Breda M35. The second model did not make use of the S-18/1000.

In addition, they were fitted with one or two 8 mm Breda model 37 machine-guns.

Service
The AS 42 Sahariana's performance was very good . From September to November 1942, the first batch of 14 vehicles was delivered to the Regio Esercito. The unit that gave the AS 42 its baptism of fire in November 1942 was the “Raggruppamento Sahariano AS”. The good results achieved by the “Raggruppamento Sahariano AS” quickly led to the formation of at least four more “Compagnia Arditi Camionettisti”: the 103rd, 112th, 113th, and 123rd.

The Sahariana was operated solely by desert raiding parties operating against the Long Range Desert Group. Its low profile allowed it to hide behind the dunes and wait for the arrival of the enemy unseen, and its great capacity for autonomous action allowed it to chase enemy forces for long periods. The AS.42 participated in the final stages of the Libyan campaign and the entire campaign in Tunisia. It was mainly assigned to aviation companies of the Auto-Saharan Company and the 103rd Battalion.

Surviving vehicles were later used by the 2nd Battalion of the 10th Regiment in the defense of Sicily and southern Italy. The same unit and the Motorized Assault Battalion employed the “Sahariana” and “Metropolitana” models in the defence of Rome on 8 September 1943. After that, a few Saharianas stayed in Northern Italy with Mussolini’s Italian Social Republic. Seven vehicles fought on the Eastern Front as part of the 2. Fallschirmjäger Division. They were in service throughout 1944 and 1945 as reconnaissance vehicles on the Eastern Front, in France, Belgium and the Netherlands. In 1943 the Polizia dell’Africa Italiana, including the “Barbarigo” battalion of the Xª MAS Flotilla. On June 4, 1944 an AS.42 stumbled across an M4 Sherman that sent a shell through the vehicle, destroying both front and rear spare tires.

The end of the war didn't mean the end of the AS 42’s service, as a dozen of these vehicles were supplied to the Polizia di Stato and, modified by the removal of weapons, pioneering tools, and Jerry cans, were painted amaranth red. They were used in Udine and Bologna until 1954. Some were produced (number unknown) specifically for the Italian State Police in 1946.

See also
S.P.A. (Società Piemontese Automobili)

Notes

References

Vanderveen, Beard: The Observer's Fighting Vehicles directory (World War II)

External links
Italian newsreel footage

World War II vehicles of Italy
Reconnaissance vehicles of World War II
Military vehicles introduced from 1940 to 1944